Quéménéven is a commune in the Finistère department of Brittany in northwestern France. Notable monuments include the Quéménéven Parish close in the village centre, and the Kergoat chapel in the hamlet Kergoat.

Population
Inhabitants of Quéménéven are called in French Quéménévenois.

See also
Communes of the Finistère department

References

External links

Official website 

Mayors of Finistère Association 

Communes of Finistère